She's So Heavy is a split EP by Japanese artists Wata (Boris) and Ai Aso. It was released in 2007 by Diwphalanx Records on 7-inch and limited to 1500 copies. The 7-inch comes with a 60-page full color photo book. Ai Aso's song is a King Crimson cover from the album Islands. Wata's side is a cover of "天使" (Angel) a Masashi Kitamura song released in Canis Lupus' 1990 album "Aqua Perspective".

Track listing

Ai Aso

Wata

Personnel

Side A
Ai Aso - vocals, mellotron
You Ishihara - guitar
Souichiro Nakamura - drums

Side B
Wata - vocals, lead guitar
Michio Kurihara - guitar
Souichiro Nakamura - mellotron
Takeshi - bass
Atsuo - drums, percussion

Pressing History

Boris (band) EPs
2007 EPs